The Alvin Eskelton Barn, located northwest of Richfield, Idaho in Lincoln County, Idaho, was built .  It was listed on the National Register of Historic Places on September 8, 1983.

It is a  structure, with eight-foot high lava rock (basalt) walls.

It was listed on the National Register as one barn in a group of lava rock structures studied together.

It has a rounded roof and a hay hood at one end, and is locally called "the round barn".

The barn may have been destroyed: satellite imagery in 2019 shows outline of a destroyed structure at approximately the coordinates given for this barn, at a property on the east side of Chatterly Road in Lincoln County.

References

External links

Barns on the National Register of Historic Places in Idaho
National Register of Historic Places in Lincoln County, Idaho
Buildings and structures completed in 1910
Lava rock buildings and structures
Barns with hay hoods